Thomas Karl Leonard Kemmerich (born 20 February 1965) is a German politician of the Free Democratic Party (FDP) who served as the Minister President of Thuringia from 5 February to 4 March 2020. With a tenure of only 28 days, he was both the shortest-serving Minister President of Thuringia and the shortest-serving head of a state government in the Federal Republic of Germany.

After Reinhold Maier in Baden-Württemberg, he was the second Minister President of the FDP in German history.

Life 
Kemmerich was born in Aachen, West Germany. He is Roman Catholic, married, and father of six children. He completed his law studies at the University of Bonn in 1989. In January 1990, just after the Peaceful Revolution in East Germany, he moved to Erfurt and became the manager of a hairdresser's chain in Thuringia.

Political career 
He served as a member of the Thuringian Landtag (state parliament) from 2007 to 2014. He became the leader of Thuringia's Free Democratic Party in 2015, and was a member of the Bundestag (federal parliament) from 2017 to 2019. He returned to the Landtag after the 2019 state election (where the FDP passed the five-percent threshold by a mere 45 votes) and served as the leader of the FDP parliamentary group consisting of five lawmakers.

Election controversy and premiership 

On 5 February 2020, Kemmerich was elected to the position of minister president in the third ballot, with the support of his FDP (being the smallest group in the state parliament) as well as lawmakers of the centre-right CDU and the far-right AfD. Incumbent minister president Bodo Ramelow of The Left had failed to win a majority in the first two ballots. The AfD had nominated its own candidate, but abandoned him in favour of Kemmerich in the third ballot, to the surprise of CDU and FDP deputies. Kemmerich's election with AfD support violated a convention among all mainstream German political parties to refuse any co-operation with the AfD, and attracted immediate fierce criticism throughout Germany and beyond.

On 6 February, one day after his election, Kemmerich delivered a statement, in which he described his position as untenable and announced a motion for the dissolution of the state parliament in order to bring about new elections. Under the provisions of the Thuringia state constitution, in order to dissolve the state parliament, a two-thirds-majority is needed, but the Thuringia AfD and CDU have both ruled out supporting a dissolution-motion. On 7 February, Kemmerich met with Birgit Keller, the President of the Landtag of Thuringia, to discuss possibilities for a swift transfer of power to a new minister president. Kemmerich announced he would stay in office until the matter is resolved in order to secure political stability for the state.

On 8 February, he resigned his post but stayed in office as acting minister president until the election of a successor, as mandated by the state constitution. As Kemmerich had not appointed any ministers, he was called a "one-man government". For the time being, the ministries were directed by state secretaries appointed under the Ramelow government. Kemmerich stayed away from the Bundesrat session on 14 February 2020, despite him being the only officeholder allowed to represent Thuringia in the chamber. Thus, the state was unrepresented for the first time since its accession to the Federal Republic in 1990. On the 4 March 2020, Kemmerich was succeeded by Bodo Ramelow who was re-elected minister president by a plurality of votes. The FDP group did not participate in this election.

References

1965 births
Living people
German Roman Catholics
Members of the Landtag of Thuringia
Members of the Bundestag for Thuringia
Ministers-President of Thuringia
21st-century German politicians
Members of the Bundestag for the Free Democratic Party (Germany)